European studies is a field of study offered by many academic colleges and universities that focuses on current developments in European integration.

Some programmes offer a social science or public administration curriculum focusing on developments in the European Union. These programmes usually include a combination of political science, EU public policy, European history, European law, economics and sociology. Other universities approach the subject in a broader manner, including topics like European culture, European literature and European languages. While all programmes focus on the study of the European Union, they often cover national topics (in a comparative perspective) as well.

The subject combines humanities and social sciences. Disciplines that are involved in European studies include:

While European studies departments are more common in Europe than elsewhere, they exist elsewhere including in North America, Asia and Australasia.

European studies associations 
 UACES - the academic association for Contemporary European Studies
 European Union Studies Association
 Arbeitskreis Europäische Integration

References

External links 

 Study in the Czech Republic
CIFE - Centre international de formation européenne 
 Master in European and European Legal Studies
 Master in Advanced European and International Studies
 Master in EU Studies Online
 Master in European Studies - Governance and Regulation 
 Master in European Studies
 Studies in European Societies (MA SES)
Library guides for European studies
 
 
 
  + "Modern European History"

 
Area studies